Military Power of the People's Republic of China is a publication of the United States Department of Defense that provides an estimation of the strength and strategy of the People's Liberation Army, the national defense force of the People's Republic of China.  The Defense Department is required to annually produce and issue the report under Section 1202 of the National Defense Authorization Act for Fiscal Year 2000 (Public Law 106–65.)

The 2006 report notes that the Chinese military has expanded its presence in the area of the Taiwan Strait and that the balance of forces is "shifting in the mainland's favor." It also states that the Chinese military budget has grown significantly, although is not keeping pace with overall government expenditures.  Based on the report, Slate magazine writer Fred Kaplan called the Chinese military a "paper tiger" that is responsible for "about a quarter of the Pentagon's budget".

However, according to the 2020 report published in September, China announced a 6.2-percent inflation-adjusted annual military budget increase in early 2019 to US$174 billion, approximately 1.3 percent of its GDP. This defense budget has nearly doubled during the past 10 years and sustains China's position as the second-largest military spender in the world (after the United States).  China has already achieved parity with — or even exceeded — the United States in several military modernization areas, including shipbuilding, land-based conventional missiles, and integrated air defenses:
 The People's Liberation Army Ground Force (PLAGF) is the largest standing ground force in the world as of 2019, and continued to transition into a modern, mobile and lethal ground force by fielding upgraded combat systems and communications equipment and enhancing its ability to conduct and manage complex combined-arms and joint operations. The PRC has one of the world's largest forces of advanced long-range surface-to-air missile systems — including Russian-built S-400s, S-300s, and domestically produced Hong Qi systems — that constitute part of its robust and redundant integrated air defense system (IADS) architecture.
 The People's Liberation Army Navy (PLAN) is the largest navy in the world as of early 2020 in terms of fleet size, with an overall battle force of approximately 350 warships and submarines, including over 130 major surface combatants (in comparison, the United States Navy's battle force is approximately 293 ships), and is an increasingly modern and flexible maritime force largely composed of modern multi-role platforms featuring advanced anti-ship, anti-air and anti-submarine weapons and sensors.  China is the top ship-producing nation in the world by tonnage and is increasing its shipbuilding capacity and capability for all naval classes.
 The People's Liberation Army Air Force (PLAAF) and People's Liberation Army Naval Air Force (PLANAF) together constitute the largest aviation forces in the region and the third largest air power in the world, with over 2,500 aircraft totally and approximately 2,000 combat aircraft.
China is also developing new intercontinental ballistic missiles (ICBMs) that will significantly improve China's nuclear-capable missile forces, and the number of warheads on the PRC's land-based ICBMs capable of threatening the contiguous United States is expected to grow to roughly 200 in the next five years, and is projected to at least double in size as China expands and modernizes its nuclear forces. China is pursuing a nuclear triad with the development of a nuclear-capable air-launched ballistic missile (ALBM) and improving its ground and sea-based nuclear capabilities. New developments in 2019 further suggest that China intends to increase the peacetime readiness of its nuclear forces by moving to a launch-on-warning (LOW) posture with an expanded silo-based force.
 The People's Liberation Army Strategic Support Force (SSF) is a theater-level command organization established to centralize the PLA's strategic space, cyber, electronic and psychological warfare missions and capabilities. The SSF Network Systems Department is responsible for cyberwarfare, technical reconnaissance, electronic warfare and psychological warfare.  China's space enterprise continues to mature rapidly, and Beijing has devoted significant resources to growing all aspects of its space program, from military space applications to civil applications such as profit-generating launches, scientific endeavors and space exploration.
 The PLA's anti-access/area-denial (A2/AD) capabilities are currently the most robust within the first island chain, although the PRC aims to strengthen its capabilities and is developing the capabilities and operational concepts to conduct offensive operations within the second island chain, in the Pacific and Indian Oceans, and in some cases, globally. In addition to strike, air and missile defense, anti-surface and anti-submarine capabilities improvements, China is focusing on information, cyber, and space/counterspace operations.

References

 Annual Report to Congress: Military Power of the People's Republic of China, from the Department of Defense
 Slate - Why the Pentagon keeps overestimating the Chinese army, by Fred Kaplan

United States Department of Defense publications
Military of the People's Republic of China